Ahmed Omar (born 1933) is a former Moroccan cyclist. He competed in the individual road race and team time trial events at the 1960 Summer Olympics.

References

External links
 

1933 births
Living people
Moroccan male cyclists
Olympic cyclists of Morocco
Cyclists at the 1960 Summer Olympics
Sportspeople from Casablanca
20th-century Moroccan people